Jerry Lynn Williams (1948–2005) was an American rock music singer and composer. He wrote such hits as "Forever Man", "See What Love Can Do", "Something's Happening", "Running on Faith" and "Pretending" for Eric Clapton. He contributed two songs, "Real Man" and "I Will Not Be Denied", to Bonnie Raitt's 1989 album Nick of Time. He had previously written material for Raitt's 1986 album Nine Lives. He also wrote songs for Robert Plant, B.B. King, Stevie Ray Vaughan and Jimmie Vaughan. As a performer, he released albums on Warner Bros. Records and CBS Records during the 1970s, and his break as a songwriter came when Delbert McClinton's cover of a song from his second album, "Givin' It Up for Your Love", reached the Top 40.

In his autobiography, Clapton recalled meeting Williams for the first time after his record label, Warner Bros. Records, sent him demos of "Forever Man", "See What Love Can Do" and "Something's Happening" as suggestions for an upcoming album, which turned out to be Behind the Sun in 1985. Clapton recalled that he "loved the way [Williams] sang". Music author Marc Roberty claims that Williams's writing "seemed to suit Eric's vocals perfectly".

Williams was born in 1948 in Dallas, Texas. He died at age 57 from kidney and liver failure on his yacht on November 25, 2005, in St. Maarten, after suffering from liver cancer. At the time of his death he was insolvent due to a divorce settlement and a judgment related to litigation over the copyrights to several of the songs he wrote.

References 

1948 births
2005 deaths
Musicians from Dallas
20th-century American singers
Singer-songwriters from Texas